Tied to a Star is the second solo studio album by Dinosaur Jr. frontman J Mascis. It was released on August 24, 2014, under Sub Pop Records.

Funny Or Die produced an official music video for the track "Every Morning", featuring comic actor/ musician Fred Armisen. The track "Wide Awake" features guest vocals from Cat Power.

Track listing

Personnel
 J Mascis - vocals, guitar, bass, keyboards, drums
 Ken Maiuri - piano on tracks 1, 4, 6, 8, 10
 Pall Jenkins - guitar on tracks 1, 4, vocals on tracks 2, 8
 Mark Mulcahy - vocals on tracks 2, 6
 Chan Marshall - vocals on track 4

References

2014 albums
J Mascis albums
Sub Pop albums